Robert S. Adler is a consumer advocate in the United States. He was a member of the U.S. Consumer Product Safety Commission, and recently served as its acting chairman from October 2019 to October 2021. He is a Democrat, and became acting chair due to a surprise vote crossing party lines from former acting chair Ann Marie Buerkle.

Work
Adler was a Professor of Legal Studies and the Luther H. Hodges, Jr. Scholar in Law & Ethics at the University of North Carolina at Chapel Hill's Kenan-Flagler Business School. He has served as the Associate Dean of the MBA Program and as Associate Dean for the School's Bachelor of Science in Business Administration Program. A recipient of teaching awards both within the business school and university-wide, Adler's research and teaching focus on consumer protection, product liability, ethics, regulation, and negotiation. Before joining the UNC faculty, Adler served as counsel on the United States House Committee on Energy and Commerce where he advised on CPSC legislative and oversight issues under the leadership of Henry Waxman. Prior to that, he spent eleven years (from 1973 to 1984) as an attorney-advisor to two commissioners at the CPSC in Washington, D.C. One of the commissioners he worked for was R. David Pittle, an original appointee at the CPSC. Before joining the CPSC's staff, Adler served as a Deputy Attorney General for the Pennsylvania Justice Department, where he headed the southwest regional office of the Pennsylvania Bureau of Consumer Protection. Adler has been elected six times to the board of directors of Consumers Union, publisher of Consumer Reports magazine. He also served on the Obama-Biden Presidential Transition Team and co-authored the agency review report on the CPSC. Adler graduated from the University of Pennsylvania and received his J.D. from the University of Michigan.

Positions
During his tenure at the CPSC, Adler has strongly supported addressing safety concerns for senior citizens, arguing that "injuries and death from consumer products begin to accelerate dramatically once consumers hit age 75." Adler has also criticized provisions in the CPSC's organic statute that govern information-sharing by the CPSC.

Selected works
Adler, Robert S.; Popper, Andrew F. (February 2019). "The Misuse of Product Misuse: Victim Blaming at Its Worst." William & Mary Business Law Review. 10 (2): 337.

References

External links
Profile as chairman at Consumer Product Safety Commission
profile at University of North Carolina

Living people
University of Pennsylvania alumni
Consumer rights activists
American lawyers
University of North Carolina at Chapel Hill faculty
U.S. Consumer Product Safety Commission personnel
University of Michigan Law School alumni
Year of birth missing (living people)
Washington, D.C., Democrats